Timothy Joseph Kane (born April 28, 1968) is an American economist who is the President and Founder of The American Lyceum, www.theamricanlyceum.org a 501(c)(3) organization seeking to promote solution-focused, civic debate. Kane was the JP Conte research fellow at the Hoover Institution, where he specialized in immigration reform. He is a former U.S. Air Force intelligence officer with two overseas tours of duty. After leaving the service, Kane explored a career in start-up technology firms while pursuing a Ph.D. in economics. After working as a teaching professor of economics, Kane served on the Joint Economic Committee of the U.S. Congress and was director of the Center for International Trade and Economics at The Heritage Foundation. Kane was also an editor of the 2007 Index of Economic Freedom, co-published by The Wall Street Journal and the Heritage Foundation, and is the author of the book Bleeding Talent: How the U.S. Military Mismanages Great Leaders and Why It's Time for a Revolution. Kane co-authored the book, Balance: The Economics of Great Powers from Ancient Rome to Modern America with Glenn Hubbard. Kane's latest book is The Immigrant Superpower: How Brains, Brawn, and Bravery Make America Stronger.

Kane ran as a Republican candidate in Ohio's 12th congressional district special election in 2018.

Personal life
Kane was born in Lansing, Michigan, and was raised in Columbus, Ohio. Kane attended public schools from K-12 in Columbus, and received his appointment to the United States Air Force Academy from Congressman Chalmers P. Wylie. He came to identify as a Republican while starting out in technology, after becoming concerned with how high taxation inhibited job creation and his ability to hire staff. He held the position of co-chair of the Conte Task Force on Comprehensive Immigration Reform and was the J-P Conte Fellow in Immigration at the Hoover Institution until 2021.

Education
Between 1986 and 1990, Kane attended the United States Air Force Academy and earned Bachelor of Science in economics and political science. Between 1995 and 2001, Kane attended the University of California, San Diego, earning a PhD in economics. His dissertation was titled “The Convergence of Nations: Three Papers on International Growth”.

Career

Formerly intelligence officer in the US Air Force, between 1990 and 1995; he was stationed in Japan, South Korea, and Andrews Air Force Base. In this role he also worked with the CIA, the Pentagon, and the National Security Agency.

Until 2021, Kane served as a research fellow at the Hoover Institution. Prior to his appointment at Hoover, he was a chief economist at the Hudson Institute. He was also a senior fellow at the Kauffman Foundation where he led the development of its first blog, www.growthology.org. Between 2004 and 2007, Kane was a director and research fellow at the Heritage Foundation. Kane specializes in economics, national security, and defense economics. His work on entrepreneurship and job creation has been cited in the 2011 Economic Report of the President. In 2008, he created a quarterly survey of economists and has provided commentary for The New York Times, USA Today, CNN, CNBC, ABC, NBC, CBS, FOX, MSNBC, Bloomberg Television, and PBS’ Nightly Business Report.

Kane also worked in governmental roles. Between 2004 and 2008, he served as both the chief labor economist and the senior economist on the Joint Economic Committee for U.S. Congress. In these roles, he published research on monthly US employment figures, analyzed macroeconomics and taxation, and organized joint hearings on employment and fundamental tax reform.

Before his academic career, Kane had experience as an entrepreneur. Between 1998 and 2000, he was the founder and director of enonymous.com, a software company that was awarded the San Diego Software Startup of the Year award in 1999. Prior to this, he was a founder and director of Neocor Tech, LLC (Japanese translation software).

He is currently the host and co-producer of Why America? a podcast discussing the benefits of US immigration with famous and influential immigrants.

Research and publications

Congressional testimony
 "American Competitiveness: Why Well-intentioned Labor Regulations for Families Can Hurt More than Help", delivered testimony before the Joint Economic Committee, June 14, 2007
 "Foreign Investment, Growth, and Economic Freedom: What Is OPIC's Role?", delivered testimony before the U.S. House Committee on Foreign Affairs, Subcommittee on Trade, May 24, 2007
 "Reforming U.S. law on unemployment insurance", delivered testimony before the Subcommittee on Income Security and Family Support of the House Committee on Ways and Means, May 4, 2006

Presentations and public speeches
 National Association of Business Economists conference, Dallas, TX, September 12, 2011
 National League of Cities, Small Business Summit, Washington, DC, August 18, 2011
 Host, Economics Bloggers Forum, Kansas City, MO, April 2011
 "How Jobless is Our Recovery?" presentation at the American Enterprise Institute, Washington, DC, May 10, 2004. The event was covered nationally on C-SPAN.

Publications
 "Development and U.S. Troop Deployment", Foreign Policy Analysis, 2011
 "U.S. Troops and Economic Growth: Regression Analysis with Robustness Tests", Garret Jones and Tim Kane, Defense and Peace Economics, 2011
 "Kauffman Economic Outlook: A Quarterly Survey of Leading Economics Bloggers, Third quarter 2011", The Ewing Marion Kauffman Foundation, August 2011
 "Kauffman Foundation Research Series: Firm Formation and Economic Growth, The Importance of Startups in Job Creation and Job Destruction, July 2010", The Ewing Marion Kauffman Foundation
 2007 Index of Economic Freedom, published by The Heritage Foundation and The Wall Street Journal, January 2007
 "Phantom Jobs and Job Losses", The Public Interest, Winter 2005
 "Global U.S. Troop Deployment, 1950–2005", Center for Data Analysis Report #06-02, May 24, 2006
 "Diverging Employment Data: A Critical View of the Payroll Survey" Center for Data Analysis Report #04-03, March 4, 2004

Commentary
 "Redefining 'Winners and Losers' on Taxes", Real Clear Politics, December 3, 2017 
 "Recessions and the presidents who inherited them", Fox News, July 6, 2012
 "Who is the divisive president?", Washington Examiner June 3, 2012
 "In pursuit of a Balanced Budget", with Glenn Hubbard, Politico, July 28, 2011
 "The Way To Cut Taxes And Deficits", American.com, December 16, 2010
 "Why Our Best Officers Are Leaving", The Atlantic, January/February 2011, pp. 80–85
 "Every Man (and Woman) an Entrepreneur", Forbes, September 13, 2010
 "Debunking the Myth of the Underprivileged Soldier", by Tim Kane and James Jay Carafano, USA Today, November 27, 2005
 "Exit Strategy – A Mere Phrase, Not a Strategy", USA Today, June 19, 2005
 "Labor's Lost Jobs", New York Times, April 7, 2004

Selected media appearances
This is not a comprehensive list.
 CNBC: Closing Bell (7/23/2012)
 PBS: Nightly Business Report, monthly commentary since mid-2010
 CNBC: Power Lunch "Job Growth a Political Issue?" (8/3/2007)
 Bloomberg: On The Economy (6/22/2007)
 CNBC: Power Lunch "Index of Economic Freedom" (03/29/2007)
 CNN: The Situation Room "Bring Back the Draft?" (11/20/2006)
 FOX: 24/7 "Military Education" (11/1/2006)
 C-SPAN: Washington Journal "Military Demographics" (05/28/2006)

Books
 Bleeding Talent: How the U.S. Military Mismanages Great Leaders and Why It's Time for a Revolution (2012)
 Balance: The Economics of Great Powers from Ancient Rome to Modern America, coauthored with Glenn Hubbard (2013)
 Total Volunteer Force: Lessons from the US Military on Leadership Culture and Talent Management (2017)
 The Immigrant Superpower: How Brains, Braun, and Bravery Make America Stronger (2022)

References

External links
 Hoover Institution
 

1968 births
Living people
United States Air Force Academy alumni
University of California, San Diego alumni
United States Air Force officers
21st-century American politicians
Economists from California
American economics writers
American male non-fiction writers
People from Columbus, Ohio
The Heritage Foundation
Economists from Ohio
21st-century American economists